Robert K. Corbin (born November 17, 1928) is an American lawyer and politician from the state of Arizona who formerly served as Attorney General of Arizona.
He later served as president of the National Rifle Association from 1992 until 1993.

Early life and education
Corbin grew was born in Worthington, Indiana and is married to Republican National Committee woman Lori Klein Corbin.
Robert Corbin previously married Helen Corbin in 1959. She died January 29, 2008. She was born January 29, 1931, in Pennsylvania. They had three daughters: Deborah, Lori and Kathy.

After completing high school Bob joined the United States Navy in 1946.

Career
Corbin started working as a Maricopa Deputy County Attorney in 1958. He was elected Maricopa County Attorney in 1964 and served one term. He was elected to the Maricopa County Board of Supervisors in 1972, and Attorney General in November 1978 and served until his retirement in January 1991, holding that office longer than any other elected official.

Attorney General
Corbin prosecuted Republican Governor Evan Mecham for misusing campaign contributions. Charges were dismissed after Mecham was impeached.
In 1987, Corbin indicted former congressman Sam Steiger for extorting a member of the parole board. Steiger was convicted but it was overturned on appeal.

References

 Tom Kollenborn Chronicles: Robert K. Corbin's Legacy

External links

1928 births
Living people
20th-century American politicians
Arizona Attorneys General
Arizona Republicans
County supervisors in Arizona
District attorneys in Arizona
Indiana University alumni
People from Greene County, Indiana
Presidents of the National Rifle Association
United States Navy sailors